Ramba may refer to:

 Ramba (comics), a comic book whose protagonist is an erotic Italian hitlady 
 Rambha (actress), an Indian actress who works in Telugu and Tamil movies
 Ramba, Tibet, a town or village in the Tibet Autonomous Region
 Ramba, Punjab, a location in the Punjab, see Pundir 
 Ramba Ral, a character in the anime series Mobile Suit Gundam
 Ramba (actress), a former Italian pornographic actress